Shanghai Television is a TV station based in Shanghai, China. It was founded in early 1980s. Its old web site address was www.stv.sh.cn. In 2001, it was merged with Radio Shanghai, Eastern Radio Shanghai, Oriental Television Station and Shanghai Cable Television under the name of Shanghai Media Group. It broadcasts 258 hours of TV and 214 hours of radio on a daily basis (2005).

See also
 Shanghai Media Group

External links
Shanghai Media Group 

Mandarin-language radio stations
Mass media in Shanghai